The Maurice Farman MF.8 was a biplane floatplane, with a pusher engine, designed and built in France circa 1913.

Specifications

References

Further reading
 

 

Biplanes
Single-engined pusher aircraft
MF.08
Canard aircraft